Florida's 15th congressional district is an electoral district for the U.S. Congress and is located in the northeastern suburbs of Tampa, including parts of Hillsborough, Pasco, and Polk counties. The district includes Plant City and Zephyrhills, as well as parts of Tampa city proper, Brandon, and Lakeland.

From 2003 to 2013, the prior 15th district contained most of Brevard County south of the city of Cocoa (including the Kennedy Space Center), all of Indian River County, most of Osceola County, and a very small portion of Polk County. The district took in the cities of Kissimmee, Melbourne, and Vero Beach, as well as Patrick Space Force Base. Boundaries were redrawn due to a lawsuit in 2015. Much of this area is now the 8th district, while the current 15th takes in most of what was previously the 12th district.

From 2013 to 2017, the district included the northern parts of Hillsborough and Polk counties. After court-ordered redistricting for the 2016 elections, it also included the southernmost parts of Lake County.

The district is currently represented by Republican Laurel Lee.

List of members representing the district

Election results

2002

2004

2006

2008

2010

2012
Republican candidate Dennis Ross won the election unopposed, as the Democrats did not nominate a candidate. Ross at the time was already the incumbent of the old 12th District prior to the 2010 reapportionment.

2014

2016

2018

2020

2022

Historical district boundaries

References

External links
2008 Race Tracker 

 Congressional Biographical Directory of the United States 1774–present

15
Florida elections